is the 15th single of Jpop band Dream. This would remain the group's symbol until their rebirth as DRM in 2007. The single reached #10 on the weekly Oricon charts and charted for six weeks. This is also dream's first single to chart within the top 10 on Oricon's weekly charts since 2000's "My will". First pressings came in a special package, and included one of nine trading cards. In its official title, the phrase "love dream" is represented by a combination heart/peace sign (resulting in frequent misreadings, usually "I love world" or "I world").

Track list
 I love dream world ~Sekaijuu no Shiawase wo Utaou~ (I love dream world　~世界中のしあわせを歌おう~; Let's Sing the Happiness of the Earth)
 I love dream world ~Sekaijuu no Shiawase wo Utaou~ (Instrumental)

DVD track list
 I　Love　Dream　World~世界中のしあわせを歌おう~Promotion　video~ (Ver．1)
 I　Love　Dream　World~世界中のしあわせを歌おう~Promotion　video~ (Ver．2)
 Single 「I　Love　Dream　World」 TV－SPOT
 Viewsic Tokuban 「I　Love　Dream　Worldプレートを創ろう」 [Director's Cut Version]

Credits
 Otowa Shiho (Lyrics)
 Shigeki Sako (Music&Arrangement)

External links
 http://www.oricon.co.jp/music/release/d/517462/1/
 http://www.oricon.co.jp/prof/artist/27290/products/cinema/529749/1/

Dream (Japanese group) songs
2003 songs
Avex Trax singles
2003 singles